Urho Teräs (7 July 1915 in Turku – 8 August 1990 in Turku) was a Finnish footballer.

He earned 11 caps at international level between 1938 and 1949, scoring 1 goal.

At club level Teräs played for TuUL and TPS.

Honours

Finnish Championship: 1939, 1941, 1945, 1949

References

1915 births
1990 deaths
Finnish footballers
Finland international footballers
Turun Palloseura footballers
Footballers from Turku

Association footballers not categorized by position
Mestaruussarja players